Hankook Ilbo is a Korean-language daily newspaper in Seoul, South Korea. As of 2017, it had a daily circulation of about 213,200. 

It was previously published by the Hankook Ilbo Media Group, however following an embezzlement scandal in 2013–2014 it was sold to Dongwha Enterprise, which also owns The Korea Times.

Political position
Hankook Ilbo tends to be economically centre-right and socially centre-left. Hankook Ilbo is a "liberal" media, but this is different from the meaning of "liberal" in the American political context.

Hankook Ilbo officially doesn't put forward ideology other than "centrism". However, Hankook Ilbo has basically shown a fiscal conservative tone that values "fiscal responsibility". The newspaper has often criticized the Moon Jae-in government's fiscal policy for its lack of awareness of "financial soundness". This newspaper also supports "liberal economy".

In contrast to the somewhat conservative tendency financially, the Hankook Ilbo has some cultural liberal tendency. The newspaper supported LGBT and other minority rights and emphasized "diversity", and also criticized the hatred of obesity in Korean society. In addition, the Hankook Ilbo has a favorable view of feminism.

See also
Economic liberalism
The Economist
List of newspapers in South Korea
The Korea Times

References

External links
 Official site 

Centrist newspapers
Daily newspapers published in South Korea
Economic liberalism
Liberal media in South Korea
Liberalism in South Korea
Mass media in Seoul